Jaroslav Stránský (6 June 1899 – March 1945) was a Czech ice hockey player. He competed in the men's tournament at the 1924 Winter Olympics.

References

External links

1899 births
1945 deaths
Czech ice hockey goaltenders
HC Slavia Praha players
Ice hockey players at the 1924 Winter Olympics
Olympic ice hockey players of Czechoslovakia
People from Nymburk
Sportspeople from the Central Bohemian Region
Czechoslovak ice hockey goaltenders